Miramar is a residential district (zona residencial) of the municipality of Playa, in the city of Havana.

Overview
Many embassies, including the landmark Russian Embassy, are located in Miramar - in particular on Quinta Avenida (Fifth Avenue) before called Avenida de las Américas (Avenue of the Americas).

Prior to the Revolution, the neighborhood was home to many of Havana's upscale residents.  There are many large houses and mansions here.  This district and the Country Club (Cubanacán) were the most glamorous spaces in the Havana of the 50s.  There are also some of Havana's more modern hotels, such as Hotel Melia Habana, Oasis Panorama Hotel and Occidental Miramar, beaches and private rental houses (known as casas particulares).  Also located here is the International School of Havana.

Since the late 1990s, several office blocks have been built in a complex called Centro de Negocios Miramar - the "Miramar Trade Center".

Points of interest

Quinta Avenida (Fifth Avenue)
 Casa de Alberto de Armas (1926), a restored Beaux-Arts mansion at Calle 2 by architect Jorge Luis Echarte
 Reloj de Quinta Avenida at Calle 10, a large clock erected in 1924 in the central median
 Museum of the Ministry of the Interior (Museo del Ministerio del Interior) at Calle 12
 Casa del Habano (between Calles 14 and 16) (also in the Melia Habana near the Miramar Trade Center and Club Habana)
 Teatro Miramar at Calle 94
 Parque de los Ahorcados (Park of the Hanged), between Calles 24 and 26, "shaded by massive jagüey trees, seemingly supported by their aerial roots dangling like cascades of water"
 Karl Marx Theater (Teatro Karl Marx) in the park
 Plaza Emiliano Zapata, with a life-size stone statue of Zapata, Mexico’s revolutionary hero
 Rosita De Hornedo Hotel, now the CIMEX corporation, located in first avenue between 0 and 2.
 Iglesia de Santa Rita de Casia (at Calle 26) — a modernist church from 1942 which mixes neocolonial and modern features by architect Victor Morales. Features a modernist statue of Santa Rita by Rita Longa
 Gracious mansions, many of them foreign embassies
 Iglesia San Antonio de Padua (at Calle 60) — Modernist-style Romanesque church (1949) by architects Eloy Norman and Salvador Figueras
 Russian Embassy (1988) (between Calles 62 and 66) by architects Alexander Rochegov and Basilio Piasecki
 Occidental Miramar hotel
 Hotel Barceló Habana Ciudad (between Calles 76 and 80)
 Miramar Trade Center
 Iglesia de Jesús de Miramar (between Calles 80 and 82), built in 1953 with a magnificent organ with 5,000 pipes. The restored church features 14 splendid oversize paintings of the Stations of the Cross by Spanish artist César Hombrados Oñativa.
El Ajibe, a restaurant visited by Anthony Bourdain on his Travel Channel program "No Reservations".   
Old Miramar Yacht Club, now a club for Cuban air force officers. The picture at right is wrong. For pictures of the Club go to miramaryachtclub.com.   
Source: "Walking Quinta Avenida", Moon Travel Guides

Parks
Parque Ecológico Monte Barreto, 9th Avenue west of Calle 70
Parque de los Ahorcados (Park of the Hanged), Quinta Avenida between Calles 24 and 26

Education
The International School of Havana, an English-language international school, is in Miramar.

The Centro Educativo Español de La Habana (CEEH), a Spanish-language international school, is in Miramar.

Notable people
 Cristina Saralegui was born in Miramar, Havana.

References

External links

 Hotels in Miramar, Havana Travel and tourism

Wards of Havana
Diplomatic districts